Service worker may refer to:

 Social service worker, a person engaged in social work
 Pink-collar worker, a person in the service industry whose labour is related to customer interaction, entertainment, sales or other service-oriented work
 Service worker, a scriptable network proxy in a web browser that manages network requests for a webpage